EUCO may be:

 European Council
 European Union Chamber Orchestra